There was also a Caucasian Albanian Catholicos Nerses I, who ruled in 689–706, and a Patriarch Nerses I of Constantinople, who ruled in 1704.

Nerses I the Great was an Armenian Catholicos (or Patriarch) who lived in the fourth century. He was the son of At'anagenes and the Arsacid princess Bambish, a sister of King Tiran and a daughter of King Khosrov III. His paternal grandfather was St. Husik I whose paternal grandfather was Saint Gregory the Illuminator. 

Nerses spent his youth in Caesarea, where he received a Hellenistic education and married a Mamikonian princess called Sandukht. Sandukht bore Nerses a son called Sahak (Isaac), who would later become Catholicos. After the death of his wife, he was appointed sword-bearer to Arsacid king Arshak II (Arsaces II).  A few years later, having entered the ecclesiastical state, he was elected Catholicos in 353 and confirmed in the office in Caesarea in accordance with tradition. 

His patriarchate marks a new era in Armenian history. Until that point, the Church had been more or less identified with the royal family and the nobles; Nerses brought it into closer connection with the people. At the Council of Ashtishat he promulgated numerous laws on marriage, fast days, and divine worship. Among other things, the council forbade people to marry their first cousin and forbade mutilation and other extreme actions in mourning. Nerses built schools, hospitals, leprosaria and poor houses and sent monks throughout the land to preach the Gospel. 

Nerses's relations with Arshak II, however, soon deteriorated. Some of the Catholicos's reforms drew upon him the king's displeasure. Nerses also clashed with Arshak over the latter's extermination of certain Armenian noble houses. In approximately 358 (possibly earlier), Nerses was sent to Constantinople to escort Arshak's bride Olympias to Armenia. Arshak, like his father, pursued a pro-Arian policy, which led to a falling out with Catholicos Nerses. According to the 5th-century historian Faustus of Byzantium, Nerses never again appeared at Arshak's court after the king ordered the murder of his own nephew, Gnel, in defiance of the Catholicos's exhortations. Nerses was exiled for some nine years along with other anti-Arian bishops, supposedly to Edessa. It was probably at some point during the latter part of Arshak's reign that Nerses went to Constantinople to ensure the emperor's support of Armenia against the Persians. According to Faustus of Byzantium, the Roman emperor Valens became outraged at Nerses condemning his following of the teachings of Arius and sent Nerses into exile.

Upon the accession of pro-Arian king Pap (Papas) in 369/370, Nerses returned to his see. Nerses undertook the reconstruction of Armenian churches and monasteries that had been destroyed during the Persian occupation of Armenia and strove toward the elimination of Zoroastrian influence in the country. The classical Armenian historians write that Papas proved a dissolute and unworthy ruler and Nerses forbade him entrance to the church. Other historians believe that Nerses tried to bring the young king under his control using his considerable influence and with the help of some Armenian princes, prompting Pap to dissolve the Patriarch's benevolent institutions and confiscate holdings belonging to the Church. According to Faustus of Byzantium and Moses of Choren, Papas invited Nerses to his table under the pretence of seeking reconciliation and reportedly poisoned him in 373. According to another theory, Nerses died of an illness of the lungs that he had contracted early in his life. Pap appointed Nerses's successor without the approval of Caesarea, which refused to recognize the bishop's authority.

In the arts
 Nerses is a character in the tragedy Nerses the Great, Patron of Armenia written in 1857 by the Western Armenian playwright, actor & editor, Sargis Vanadetsi, also known as Sargis Mirzayan.

References

Sources

 Faustus of Byzantium, History of the Armenians, 5th century.
 
 
 Moses of Chorene, History of Armenia, 5th century,

See also 
 Gregorids

Armenian saints
4th-century Armenian bishops
4th-century births
373 deaths
Catholicoi of Armenia
4th-century Christian saints